DSL or digital subscriber line is a family of technologies that provide digital data transmission over the wires of a local telephone network.

DSL may also refer to:
Damn Small Linux, a very small Linux distribution
Danish Sign Language
Data Security Law of the People's Republic of China
Definitive software library
Design Science License, a copyleft license for intellectual property
Diagnostic Systems Laboratories, a company now part of Beckman-Coulter
Dictionary of the Scots Language
Domain-specific language, a specialized computer language
Digital subscriber line, a device used to connect a computer or router to a telephone line
Dominican Summer League of baseball 
DSL, a musical artist signed to Ed Banger Records
Deutsche Schule Lagos, or the German School Lagos